Microlasma is a genus of symmetrical sessile barnacles in the family Pachylasmatidae. There are at least four described species in Microlasma.

Species
These species belong to the genus Microlasma:
 Microlasma arwetergum (Rosell, 1991)
 Microlasma crinoidophilum (Pilsbry, 1911)
 Microlasma fragile Jones, 2000
 Microlasma ochriderma (Foster, 1981)

References

External links

 

Barnacles